Bothynostethini is a small neotropical tribe of solitary wasps partly recognizable for having peculiar modifications at the apex of the hind femora.

References 

Crabronidae
Hymenoptera tribes